Moscow Railway is a subsidiary of Russian Railways that handles half of Russia's suburban railway operations and a quarter of the country's passenger traffic. As of 2009 the railway, which has its headquarters near Komsomolskaya Square in Moscow, employed 73 600 people. It manages railway services in much of Central Russia, including Moscow and Moscow Oblast (all railways except the railroad to Saint Petersburg, which is managed by October Railway), Smolensk, Vladimir, Ryazan, Tula, Kaluga, Bryansk, Oryol, Lipetsk, and Kursk Oblasts.

Railway lines

Ryazansky suburban railway line
Kazansky suburban railway line
Gorkovsky suburban railway line
Kursky suburban railway line
Paveletsky suburban railway line
Kiyevsky suburban railway line
Belorussky suburban railway line
Rizhsky suburban railway line
Savyolovsky suburban railway line
Yaroslavsky suburban railway line
Little Ring of the Moscow Railway
Moscow Big Ring Railway

Construction timeline
1861 Moscow-Petushki
1862 Moscow-Nizhny Novgorod
1862 Moscow-Sergiyev Posad
1865 Moscow-Kolomna-Ryazan
1868 Serpukhov-Tula-Oryol-Kursk
1870 Sergiyev Posad-Alexandrov
1870 Moscow-Mozhaysk-Smolensk
1899 Moscow-Sukhinichi-Bryansk
1900 Moscow-Savyolovo
1908 Moscow Little Ring Railway
1943-1960 Moscow Big Ring Railway

Railway stations 
 Belorussky Rail Terminal
 Kazansky Rail Terminal
 Kiyevsky Rail Terminal
 Kursky Rail Terminal
 Leningradsky Rail Terminal
 Paveletsky Rail Terminal
 Rizhsky Rail Terminal
 Savyolovsky Rail Terminal
 Yaroslavsky Rail Terminal

See also

 Museum of the Moscow Railway

References

External links 
 

 
Rail transport in Moscow
Rail transport in Moscow Oblast
Railway lines in Russia
1959 establishments in Russia